Olenecamptus pseudostrigosus is a species of beetle in the family Cerambycidae. It was described by Stephan von Breuning in 1938.

Subspecies
 Olenecamptus pseudostrigosus burmensis Dillon & Dillon, 1948
 Olenecamptus pseudostrigosus didius Dillon & Dillon, 1948
 Olenecamptus pseudostrigosus pseudostrigosus Breuning, 1938

References

Dorcaschematini
Beetles described in 1938